Sir Joseph Banks (1743–1820) was a British naturalist and botanist.

Joseph or Joe Banks may also refer to:
Joseph Banks (Grimsby MP) (1665–1727), Member of Parliament (MP) for Grimsby, 1715 and Totnes, 1722
Joseph Banks (MP for Peterborough) (1695–1741), MP for Peterborough, 1728
Joseph Henry Banks (1843–1916), British soldier
Joseph Banks Rhine (1895–1980), American botanist and parapsychologist
Joe Banks, member of the punk band Avail
Joe Banks, hero of the film Joe Versus the Volcano

See also

JoS. A. Bank Clothiers, a men's clothing company
Banks (surname)